Loriano Valentini (born 16 July 1950 in Grosseto) is an Italian politician.

Biography
Former member of the Italian Communist Party, he joined the Democratic Party of the Left and was elected Mayor of Grosseto in substitution of Flavio Tattarini on 23 January 1992, after the election of mayor Tattarini at the Italian Parliament. Valentini was re-elected in 1993. He ran for a new term at the 1997 Italian local elections, but was defeated by the centre-right candidate Alessandro Antichi.

He served as member of the Regional Council of Tuscany from 2000 to 2010.

Valentini was also president of Fondazione Grosseto Cultura (2012–16) and director of the historical institute ISGREC (2019–21).

See also
1993 Italian local elections
1997 Italian local elections
2000 Italian regional elections
2005 Italian regional elections
List of mayors of Grosseto

References

Bibliography

External links

1950 births
Living people
Mayors of Grosseto
Democrats of the Left politicians
Democratic Party of the Left politicians
Italian Communist Party politicians
Democratic Party (Italy) politicians
Politicians from Grosseto